Conquered Kingdoms is a fantasy strategy computer game developed by Quantum Quality Productions for PC DOS/MS-DOS in 1992.

Plot
The player commands human and fantasy units, using them to seize more territory, and players gain points by occupying other towns, obtaining castles, and triumphing over enemy units.

Development
The game was announced at the 1992 Consumer Electronics Show, alongside Battles of Destiny.

Reception
Conquered Kingdoms was reviewed in 1993 in Dragon #194 by Hartley, Patricia, and Kirk Lesser in "The Role of Computers" column. The reviewers gave the game 4 out of 5 stars. In a 1993 survey of pre 20th-century strategy games, Computer Gaming World gave the game two-plus stars out of five, stating "While gameplay is high, this reviewer admits to a distaste for obscuring decent wargames with fantasy elements". A reviewer who called Conquered Kingdoms "a gem of a game" disliked Scenario Disk #1, stating that the expansion's maps were not as good as the original's.

Reviews
PC Games (Germany) - Mar, 1993
ASM (Aktueller Software Markt) - Jan, 1993
Computer Gaming World - Jun, 1993
PC Games (Germany) - Oct, 1993

References

External links
Conquered Kingdoms at MobyGames
Conquered Kingdoms at GameSpot
Conquered Kingdoms at GameFAQs

1992 video games
DOS games
DOS-only games
Quantum Quality Productions games
Video games developed in the United States